Acacia dielsii, commonly known as Diels' wattle, is a shrub of the genus Acacia and the subgenus Plurinerves that is native to Western Australia.

Description
It blooms from February to September and produces yellow flowers. The simple inflorescences occur as two per axil with spherical flower-heads that have a diameter of  contain 8 to 17 loosely grouped golden flowers. The brittle seed pods that follow break easily into single seed units at the constrictions.

Taxonomy
The species was first formally described in 1904 by the botanist Ernst Georg Pritzel as part of the work between Pritzel and Ludwig Diels Fragmenta Phytographiae Australiae occidentalis. Beitrage zur Kenntnis der Pflanzen Westaustraliens, ihrer Verbreitung und ihrer Lebensverhaltnisse as published in Botanische Jahrbücher für Systematik, Pflanzengeschichte und Pflanzengeographie. It was reclassified as Racosperma dielsii in 2003 by Leslie Pedley then transferred back to the genus Acacia in 2006. The only other synonym is Acacia ewartiana.

A. dielsii is closely related to Acacia nivea and Acacia obesa which together make up the "A. dielsii group" of wattles.

The specific epithet honours the German botanist Ludwig Diels.

Distribution
It is endemic to an area in the Mid West, Wheatbelt and Goldfields-Esperance regions of Western Australia where it is found on flats, sandplains and low rises growing in gravelly sandy soils around laterite. The distribution is a belt that starts in the north from the catchment of the Murchison River to the east of Kalbarri that extends in a south easterly direct to around Newdegate with more scattered populations as far south as Ravensthorpe. It is often part of open scrub and shrubland communities.

See also
 List of Acacia species

References

dielsii
Acacias of Western Australia
Taxa named by Ernst Pritzel
Plants described in 1904